Mullinavat is a town in south County Kilkenny, Ireland. Its main industries are tourism and agriculture. It has a renowned sporting history, particularly in hurling. The town's name in Irish translates as 'The Mill of the Stick' which, according to local tradition, may refer to a mill which could only be approached by means of a rough stick over the Glendonnel River; today that bridge is located on the main road beside the Garda Barracks.

Location and access

The village is located centrally on the R448 Naas–Waterford road. The town was by-passed in July 2010 when the Kilkenny–Waterford section of the M9 opened. There are link roads to New Ross and Piltown from the town centre. The town is bounded by Killahy in the upper end of the parish to Fahee (Fahy) in the lower end, a distance of 11 km. In the west lies Rathnasmolagh with Listrolin at the eastern extremity, a distance of 10 km.

Transport
Mullinavat railway station opened on 21 May 1853 and finally closed on 1 January 1963.

The town is served by Bus Éireann; services on route 4 run from 07:10 until 18.10 on the Dublin Route, and from 00.40 until 22.10 on the Waterford route. Despite campaigns, there is no commuter service to Waterford from Mullinavat, as it is located in the Kilkenny county area.

History

Mullinavat originally comprised the civil parishes of Kilbeacon, Kilahy and Rossinan, all located in the barony of Knocktopher.

Notable features
Tory Hill (Ir. Sliabh gCruinn, 'Round Mountain') rising to a height of 292 metres above sea level, is said to have derived its name from an outlaw named Edmund Den, who flourished in this locality around the year 1700. There is a pattern held each year on Tory Hill on the second Sunday of July. This is locally called 'Tory Hill Sunday' and 'Frocchans Sunday'. It never was a religious celebration, but merely consisted of the people of the neighbourhood gathering to pick the wild berries called 'Frocchans'. In the Holy Year of 1950 a large cross was erected on the summit of the hill, and since then the rosary had been said by the people who gather beneath the cross.

Named after 'Fort of the Wren', nearby Listrolin is situated in the heart of the Walsh Mountains, overlooking Mullinavat, Mooncoin, Kilmacow and Tempelorum. Listrolin and the so-called Walsh Mountains, were acquired by the Walsh family when they landed in Ireland with Strongbow. This area was controlled by the family until Oliver Cromwell invaded the area. It was once full of castles owned by the family's descendants. In 1946 the townlands of Clonassy, Listrolin and Rochestown were annexed from Mooncoin, becoming part of Mullinavat district parish. The ancient church of this district stood in Listrrolin, in the laneway leading over the Assy River to Ballinacoaley. Around the year 1850, the remains of the old church and graveyard were uprooted and tilled.

Clonassey Castle is located nearby, and the remains of the foundations are to be seen in what is still known as 'The Castle Field'. Its last occupant was Robert Walsh, Member of Parliament for County Kilkenny in the parliament of 1689. He was slain at the siege of Limerick in 1691.

Inchicarron Castle was occupied by poet John Mac Walter Walsh. He was known as 'Tatter Jack Walsh', Tatter meaning father or head of the clan. Only one of his poems survives, but the name of the best-known Walsh dance tune is still 'Tatter Jack Walsh'. In his old age, his property was confiscated, and he betook himself to friends in Lismatigue. He died in 1660 and was buried in Kilbeacon cemetery.

Sport

Mullinavat Football Club was formed in 1887. Gaelic football was the dominant sport in the parish until around 1913 when a hurling team from Mullinavat entered the Junior championship for the first time. The present pitch was bought in 1953 for £590 at the instigation of Fr. Joseph Gallavan was the driving force behind the purchase and development of the field.

Economy

The main economic activities are services (hardware and machinery hire), tourism, construction  and agriculture. Public services include health centres and the Teagasc centre which provides agricultural training and advice. Local authority planning rulings forbid large-scale development in the town.

Mulinavat is in an area of productive land, which has been exploited for agriculture and forestry. The main tillage crops are barley, oats, wheat, miscanthus  and maize. Production of sugarbeet stopped with the closure of the Carlow sugar plant. Dairy farming is also important with most milk being supplied to Tirlán. There is also beef or livestock farming. Minority forms of farming include bull breeding (Hereford) and poultry. Many farmers in the area work in a mixture of all the above areas in typical mixed farms. 
Some farmers in Mullinavat are active participants in the EU's Rural environmental protection scheme REPS scheme to maintain and improve the rural environment for both commercial farming and the natural habitats.

Large scale afforestation is undertaken by Coillte, the national forestry company. Forestry has been important in Mullinavat since the 1960s, mainly conifer plantations. In recent years, Government policy has promoted the development of deciduous woodland using species such as oak, beech and ash.

See also
 List of towns and villages in Ireland

Further reading
 Ireland, Slavery & Anti Slavery: 1612–1865 by Nini Rodgers.

References

Towns and villages in County Kilkenny
Census towns in County Kilkenny